The 1973–74 season was the 65th year of football played by Dundee United, and covers the period from 1 July 1973 to 30 June 1974. United finished in eighth place in the First Division and reached their first Scottish Cup final losing 3–0 to Celtic.

Match results
Dundee United played a total of 53 competitive matches during the 1973–74 season.

Legend

All results are written with Dundee United's score first.
Own goals in italics

First Division

Scottish Cup

League Cup

Texaco Cup

References

See also
 1973–74 in Scottish football

Dundee United F.C. seasons
Dundee United